Mecynorhina passerinii, the Orange-Spotted Fruit Chafer,  is a species of beetles belonging to the family Scarabaeidae, subfamily Cetoniinae.

Subspecies
 Mecynorhina passerinii dukei (Allard, 1985) 
 Mecynorhina passerinii nigricans (Fairmaire, 1897) 
 Mecynorhina passerinii passerinii (Westwood, 1844)

Description
Males show large forward-projecting horns. Elytra are black or dark brown with orange spots. The coloration of the thoracic shield (pronotum) may be yellowish, brown or black, usually with a broad brown or black central stripe. Hind tibiae and tarsi are orange-brown. These beetles feed on sap of the Bridelia micrantha.

Distribution
This species can be found in South Africa, Eswatini, Mozambique, Zimbabwe, Zambia, Democratic Republic of the Congo and Tanzania.

References

 De Palma (M.) & Frantz (S.), 2010. Taxonomic revision of Megalorhina Westwood and subgeneric classification of Mecynorhina Hope, Natura Edizioni Scientifiche
 Biolib
 Brian Morris   Insects and Human Life
 Mike Picker,Charles Griffiths,Alan Weaving  Field Guide to Insects of South Africa

Cetoniinae
Beetles described in 1844